Sarnaik is a surname. Notable people with the surname include: 

Arun Sarnaik (1935–1984), Indian actor and singer
Khemirao Sarnaik (1605–1650), Indian warrior
Pratap Sarnaik, Indian politician
Purvesh Sarnaik (born 1991), Indian politician, film producer, and businessperson